Your Baby Is a Lady is an LP album by Jackie DeShannon, released by Atlantic Records as catalog number SD-7303 in 1974.

Track listing

Personnel
Jackie DeShannon - lead and backing vocals
Cornell Dupree, Hugh McCracken, Keith Loving - guitar
William Salter - bass
Richard Tee, Arthur Jenkins - piano, organ
Ken Bichel - synthesizer
Steve Gadd, Andrew Smith - drums
Ralph MacDonald - percussion
Cissy Houston, Deirdre Tuck, Gwen Guthrie, Judy Clay, Sammy Turner, J.R. Bailey - backing vocals
David "Fathead" Newman - tenor and alto saxophone
Garnett Brown - trombone solo on "I Won't Let You Go"
Technical
Gene Paul, Lew Hahn, Bob Liftin - engineer

1974 albums
Jackie DeShannon albums
Atlantic Records albums